Vico Equense is a coastal town and comune in the Metropolitan City of Naples, in southern Italy.

Geography
Vico Equense is part of the greater Bay of Naples metropolitan area and is a tourist destination. Located on a tuff cliff, it is relatively close to the ferry to the island of Capri, the volcano Vesuvius, the Monte Faito and the ancient town of Pompeii.

The town is bordered by Castellammare di Stabia, Meta, Piano di Sorrento, Pimonte and Positano.

Climate
The weather in Vico Equense is generally mild and humid all year round: the town experiences a hot-summer-Mediterranean climate (Csa on climate maps). Summers are long, lasting from mid/late May to mid/late September with average highs in the 80s (26,5-31 °C) and average lows around 66-74 degrees Fahrenheit (18-23 °C). Rainfall is low but brief afternoon thunderstorms can occur from time to time, humidity values stand between 50 and 80%. The hottest part of the year is mid-July to mid-August.
Autumn begins in October and lasts until early December with temperature in the 50s and low 60s (10-16 °C) during the night and in the 60s or low 70s (16-22 °C) during the day. Autumn is the rainiest season, with October, November and December being the wettest months of the year; on average 14 inches (355 mm) of rain falls in those three months.
Winters are mild to cool and rather short, lasting from mid/late December to late February or March, depending on years. Rainfall is common to abundant and the temperature stands in the mid-upper 40s or 50s (6-13 °C) at night and in the 50s (10°C-16°C) during the day. It is common to have sunny and mild days even in the middle of January, with daytime highs sometimes climbing into the upper 60s (17°C-19°C). Snowfall is occasional but not uncommon at higher elevations, in the town centre snow flurries are extremely rare, while snow accumulation is even rarer. Frost happens generally once every several years. The coldest month is January but recent winters had seen cold episodes later in the season, even in March.
During March the weather is changeable, often windy and cool with occasional showers, temperatures stand between the mid/upper 40s (6-9 °C) and the upper 50s or low 60s (14-17 °C). Episodes of unusual cold ( high of 41 °F (5 °C) on 22 March 2017) or warmth ( high of 72 °F (22 °C) on 7 March 2019) have been recorded throughout the month.
Spring is very pleasant with temperatures in the 50s (10-15 °C) at night and between the lower 60s and the lower 70s at daytime (16-22 °C). Rainfall is less frequent from March all over to June but not uncommon. In May the first thunderstorms of the "cherry season" occur.
The highest temperature ever recorded was 100 °F (37.8 °C) on 11 August 2021; the lowest was 29.1 °F (-1.6 °C) on 31 December 2014. The highest overnight low temperature was 82.2°F (27.9°C) on 11 August 2021, the lowest daytime high temperature was 37.4°F (3°C) on 7 January 2017. The area suffered from extreme drought during the latter half of 2016 and all of 2017, a year when numerous wildfires destroyed much of the forest cover on Mt. Vesuvius.
The heaviest snowfall in the town centre was 0.7 inches (1.8 cm) on 31 December 2014 and 27 February 2018 and the most severe frost occurred on 6–8 January 2017, which are the coldest three days of the last decades. There are on average 0 days below freezing and 8 days where the temperature fails to reach 50 °F (10 °C). Despite this, at higher elevations in the Lattari mountains chain heavy snowfall and snowstorms have been recorded, but these events have become more rare in recent years. The heaviest snowfall in recent memory happened on 20 January 2023, when about 60 to 80 centimeters of snow fell in less than 24 hours at elevations of at least 900 m. 
During the summer, there are about 15 days where the temperature climbs to 90 °F (32 °C). The first day that sees temperature at or above 70 °F (21 °C) is on average in late April; the first day on which temperature reaches 80 °F (27 °C) is in early June.
Due to climate change, Vico Equense is experiencing cold and hot extremes as it has never seen before, along with drought and heavy rainfall or hail in such severe storms that are unprecedented in the region's meteorological history. For example, record cold and unusual snowfall, prolonged periods of muggy and hot weather during the summer or the wind storm of 29 October 2018 when the highest wind speed and gust ever recorded occurred: respectively 44 knots (51 mph)(82 km/h) and 60 knots (69 mph) (111 km/h). Overall though, the town enjoys a very stable weather, and quick temperature changes are mostly unheard of.

History

A 7th century pre-Roman necropolis has been found in the area. Later, when it was called Aequana (in Latin), Roman patricians chose it for their villas. After a long decline, the centre started to flourish again in the late 13th century, when it became independent from the Duchy of Sorrento and King Charles II of Naples repeatedly sojourned in the town, where he also built a castle (1301). The cathedral, the only example of a Gothic Cathedral in the Sorrentine Peninsula, also dates to this period.

Vico Equense was the birthplace of the playwright and dabbler in natural magic Giambattista Della Porta (1535-1615).

The great Russian dancer, Violetta Elvin, born Prokhorova, lived with her family in Vico Equense, where she took refuge in 1956 after abandoning a successful career in all theatres of the world. Her career will be reconstructed in the biographical novel by Raffaele Lauro entitled "Dance The Love – A Star in Vico Equense", to be published by GoldenGate Edizioni in 2016.

Bruce Springsteen's maternal grandfather, Antonio Zerilli, was from Vico Equense. He dedicated the song "My Hometown" to the place.

Monuments and places of interest

The Church of the Annunciation was the cathedral of the Diocese of Vico Equense, until 1818, when it was abolished. Built in the early 14th century on a clifftop overlooking the sea, it is an example of Gothic architecture, while the facade is in Baroque style.

The Antiquarium Silio Italico is an archaeological museum founded in 1966 that collects mainly funerary objects found in a necropolis, discovered in Vico Equense during the construction of some buildings in the 1960s and 1970s.

The Campanian Mineralogic Museum, founded in 1992, had originally on display a collection of mineral samples donated by Pasquale Discepolo, a local engineer. As the years went by the museum has further enriched its collections, adding various display sections dedicated to gemstones, palaeontology and even anthropology. The museum is one of the most important Campanian science museums.

Among the natural attractions of the area is the  Scrajo spa, founded in 1895. At the spa, they offer therapies for various diseases, thanks to the several sources of sulfur water that feed into the centre. The complex is also used for beach tourism, thanks to its proximity to the sea.

Transport

Railroad
Since 1948, Vico Equense is crossed by the Circumvesuviana railway network. 
The city has three stations. The main station is called "Vico Equense" and serves the village centre. The station "Seiano" serves the fraction of Seiano and the station "Scrajo Terme" that allows access to tourists to the nearby spa and bathing.

Harbors
The city is served by the harbour of Vico Equense, mainly used by fishing vessels and boats of tourist use, and the larger port of Seiano, also used for passenger service to Capri and Sorrento. Both ports are connected to the city centre with a bus service.

See also
Sorrentine Peninsula
Amalfi Coast

References

External links

 Vico Equense Interactive Map
Vico Equense Information

Cities and towns in Campania
Coastal towns in Campania